Ameivula ocellifera, Spix's whiptail, is a species of teiid lizard found in Brazil and Argentina.

References

ocellifera
Reptiles described in 1825
Lizards of South America
Taxa named by Johann Baptist von Spix